Kunto Ojansivu (born 22 December 1959 in Rovaniemi, Finland) is a Finnish television actor who has appeared in several Finnish films.

Ojansivu made his debut on TV in 1989, appearing in a number of TV series in the 1990s.

In film, Ojansivu has worked with director Timo Koivusalo on several occasions appearing in the film Rentun Ruusu in 2001 and in the 2003 film Sibelius alongside actors such as Martti Suosalo, Heikki Nousiainen, Seela Sella, Miina Turunen, Vesa Vierikko, Raimo Grönberg and Jarmo Mäkinen.

He appeared on several episodes of Peräkamaripojat on television in 2001.

External links

1959 births
Living people
People from Rovaniemi
20th-century Finnish male actors
Finnish male television actors
21st-century Finnish male actors
Finnish male film actors